Struan Douglas (born 18 September 1966) is a Scottish Rugby league International and a partner at Coulters Property, Edinburgh.

Family 

Douglas' father John was a Scotland Rugby Union international,  a British Lion and the owner of the Grand National winning horse Rubstic, and his grandfather was Alexander H Brown - a former president of the Scottish Rugby Union and rugby union international

References 

1966 births
Living people
Scotland national rugby league team players
Scottish rugby league players